Benjamin or Ben Richardson may refer to:
Benjamin Ward Richardson (1828–1896), British physician and writer on medical history
Benjamin Parkyn Richardson (1857–1910), member of the first North-West Legislative Assembly
Ben Richardson (born 1983), British cinematographer
Ben Richardson (basketball) (born 1996), basketball player
Ben Richardson, a Coronation Street character
Ben Richardson, Canadian bassist of Grady